Pima County is a county in the south central region of the U.S. state of Arizona. As of the 2020 census, the population was 1,043,433, making it Arizona's second-most populous county. The county seat is Tucson, where most of the population is centered. The county is named after the Pima Native Americans who are indigenous to this area.

Pima County includes the entirety of the Tucson Metropolitan Statistical Area, and it is the third largest metropolitan area in the Southwestern United States.

Pima County contains parts of the Tohono O'odham Nation, as well as all of the San Xavier Indian Reservation, the Pascua Yaqui Indian Reservation, Organ Pipe Cactus National Monument, Ironwood Forest National Monument and Saguaro National Park.

The vast majority of the county population lies in and around the city of Tucson (2021 city population: 543,242), filling much of the eastern part of the county with urban development. Tucson, Arizona's second largest city, is a major commercial and academic center. Other urban areas include the Tucson suburbs of Marana (population 44,792), Oro Valley (population 44,350), Sahuarita (population 29,318), and South Tucson (population 5,643), a large ring of unincorporated urban development, and the growing satellite town Green Valley. The rest of the county is sparsely populated; the largest towns are Sells, the capital of the Tohono O'odham Nation, and Ajo in the county's far western region.

History
Pima County, one of the four original counties in Arizona, was created by the 1st Arizona Territorial Legislature with land acquired through the Gadsden Purchase from Mexico in 1853.  The original county consisted of all of Arizona Territory east of longitude 113° 20' and south of the Gila River.  Soon thereafter, the counties of Cochise, Graham and Santa Cruz were carved from the original Pima County.

Geography

Topographic features
 Mountains of Pima County
 Fresnal Canyon

Major highways
  Interstate 10
  Interstate 19
  Historic U.S. Route 80
  State Route 77
  State Route 83
  State Route 85
  State Route 86
  State Route 210
  State Route 989

Adjacent counties and municipalities

 Yuma County – west
 Maricopa County – north
 Pinal County – north
 Graham County – northeast
 Cochise County – east
 Santa Cruz County – southeast east and south 
 Altar, Sonora, Mexico – south
 Caborca, Sonora, Mexico – south
 General Plutarco Elías Calles, Sonora, Mexico – south
 Sáric, Sonora, Mexico – south

National protected areas
 Buenos Aires National Wildlife Refuge
 Cabeza Prieta National Wildlife Refuge (part)
 Coronado National Forest (part)
 Ironwood Forest National Monument (part)
  Las Cienegas National Conservation Area (part)
 Organ Pipe Cactus National Monument
 Saguaro National Park

Sonoran Desert Conservation Plan
The Sonoran Desert Conservation Plan (SDCP) is Pima County's plan for desert conservation.

Demographics

2000 census
As of the census of 2000, there were 843,746 people, 332,350 households, and 212,039 families living in the county.  The population density was 92 people per square mile (35/km2).  There were 366,737 housing units at an average density of 40 per square mile (15/km2).  The racial makeup of the county was 75.1% White, 3.0% Black or African American, 3.2% Native American, 2.0% Asian, 0.1% Pacific Islander, 13.3% from other races, and 3.2% from two or more races.  29.3% of the population were Hispanic or Latino of any race. 22.8% reported speaking Spanish at home.

There were 332,350 households, out of which 29.2% had children under the age of 18 living with them, 47.7% were married couples living together, 11.8% had a female householder with no husband present, and 36.2% were non-families. 28.5% of all households were made up of individuals, and 9.4% had someone living alone who was 65 years of age or older.  The average household size was 2.47 and the average family size was 3.06.

In the county, the population was spread out, with 24.6% under the age of 18, 10.9% from 18 to 24, 28.4% from 25 to 44, 21.9% from 45 to 64, and 14.2% who were 65 years of age or older.  The median age was 36 years. For every 100 females there were 95.7 males.  For every 100 females age 18 and over, there were 92.7 males.

The median income for a household in the county was $36,758, and the median income for a family was $44,446. Males had a median income of $32,156 versus $24,959 for females. The per capita income for the county was $19,785.  About 10.5% of families and 14.7% of the population were below the poverty line, including 19.4% of those under age 18 and 8.2% of those age 65 or over.

2010 census
As of the census of 2010, there were 980,263 people, 388,660 households, and 243,167 families living in the county. The racial makeup of the county was 74.3% white, 3.5% black or African American, 3.3% American Indian, 2.6% Asian, 0.2% Pacific islander, 12.3% from other races, and 3.7% from two or more races. Those of Hispanic or Latino origin made up 34.6% of the population.

The largest ancestry groups were:

 30.8% Mexican
 16.2% German
 10.6% Irish
 9.9% English
 4.5% Italian
 3.1% French
 2.8% American
 2.7% Polish
 2.4% Scottish
 1.8% Scotch-Irish
 1.7% Norwegian
 1.6% Dutch
 1.6% Swedish
 1.1% Russian

Of the 388,660 households, 29.8% had children under the age of 18 living with them, 44.5% were married couples living together, 12.8% had a female householder with no husband present, 37.4% were non-families, and 29.2% of all households were made up of individuals. The average household size was 2.46 and the average family size was 3.06. The median age was 37.7 years.

The median income for a household in the county was $45,521 and the median income for a family was $57,377. Males had a median income of $42,313 versus $33,487 for females. The per capita income for the county was $25,093. About 11.2% of families and 16.4% of the population were below the poverty line, including 22.6% of those under age 18 and 8.5% of those age 65 or over.

Metropolitan Statistical Area
The United States Office of Management and Budget has designated Pima County as the Tucson, AZ Metropolitan Statistical Area.  The United States Census Bureau ranked the Tucson, AZ Metropolitan Statistical Area as the 53rd most populous metropolitan statistical area of the United States as of July 1, 2012.

The Office of Management and Budget has further designated the Tucson, AZ Metropolitan Statistical Area as a component of the more extensive Tucson-Nogales, AZ Combined Statistical Area, the 53rd most populous combined statistical area and the 59th most populous primary statistical area of the United States as of July 1, 2012.

Government, policing, and politics
Pima County is governed by a five-member Board of Supervisors who set ordinances and run services for the areas that do not fall within any city or town's jurisdiction.

In Arizona, counties are creatures of the state, and do not have charters of their own. The county Board of Supervisors acts under powers delegated by state law, mainly related to minor ordinances and revenue collection. With few exceptions, these powers are narrowly construed. The state legislature devotes considerable time to local matters, with legislative approval required for many of the most basic local issues.

Board of Supervisors and elected positions
The Pima County Board of Supervisors is responsible for steering public policy in the region. The five-member board provides direction to the County Administrator, Jan Lesher, and the county's various departments as they work to ensure safe communities, nurture economic development, sustainably manage natural resources and protect public health. In addition to overseeing the delivery of a host of municipal services, from roads to parks and libraries and law enforcement, board members also are responsible for approving the county budget. Elected to four-year terms, board members also set the amount of taxes to be levied.

Along with the Board of Supervisors the Arizona State Constitution allows for 7 other county elected officials.

Pima County sheriff
The Pima County Sheriff's Department provides court protection, administers the county jail, provides coroner service, and patrols the unincorporated parts of Pima County. It is the seventh largest sheriff's department in the nation. Incorporated towns within the county with municipal police departments are Tucson, Marana, Oro Valley, and Sahuarita.

Politics
Being home to a major population center and a major research university, Pima County is one of the most reliably Democratic counties in Arizona. After voting Democratic through 1930s and 1940s, it swung to Republican following major population increase after World War II, becoming a Republican-leaning county. However, in 1964, it rejected Arizona's native son Barry Goldwater by seven points, who won statewide by one point. However, despite the county's Republican lean, Democrats would not win 40% of the vote only twice - in 1972, when George McGovern lost in a 49-state landslide and due to a balloting error in the county, the Socialist Workers Party came a distant third with 18% of the vote; and in 1980, when Jimmy Carter, being largely insensitive to Western states' issues, also lost many votes to independent John B. Anderson. Following Bill Clinton's plurality victory by 12 points in 1992, all Democrats since 1996 have won the county by a majority and no Republican has come closer than six points in recapturing the county. In both 2016 and 2020, Donald Trump became the first Republican since Bob Dole in 1996 to fail to win 40% of the county's vote.

Communities

Cities
 South Tucson
 Tucson (county seat)

Towns
 Marana (Partially in Pinal County)
 Oro Valley
 Sahuarita

Census-designated places

 Ajo
 Ak Chin
 Ali Chuk
 Ali Chukson
 Ali Molina
 Anegam
 Arivaca
 Arivaca Junction
 Avra Valley
 Casas Adobes
 Catalina
 Catalina Foothills
 Chiawuli Tak
 Charco
 Comobabi
 Corona de Tucson
 Cowlic
 Drexel Heights
 Elephant Head
 Flowing Wells
 Green Valley
 Gu Oidak
 Haivana Nakya
 J-Six Ranchettes
 Kleindale
 Ko Vaya
 Littletown (former)
 Maish Vaya
 Nelson
 Nolic
 Picture Rocks
 Pimaco Two
 Pisinemo
 Rillito
 Rincon Valley
 San Miguel
 Santa Rosa
 Sells
 South Komelik
 Summerhaven
 Summit
 Tanque Verde
 Three Points
 Topawa
 Tucson Estates
 Tucson Mountains
 Vail
 Valencia West
 Ventana
 Wahak Hotrontk
 Why
 Willow Canyon

Indian communities
 Pascua Yaqui
 San Xavier
 Tohono O'odham (part)

Other communities
 Drexel-Alvernon
 East Sahuarita
 Kentucky Camp
 Lukeville
 Redington
 Sasabe
 Tortolita

Ghost towns
 Achi
 Ahan Owuch
 Ak Chut Vaya
 Allen
 Cerro Colorado
 Helvetia
 Hahuul Kawuch Vay, Arizona
 Kentucky
 Pantano
 Redington
 San Rafael
 Total Wreck
 Twin Buttes
 List of ghost towns in Arizona

County population ranking
The population ranking of the following table is based on the 2010 census of Pima County.

† county seat

Education
School districts with territory in the county, no matter how slight (even if the schools and administration are in other counties), include:

Unified:

 Ajo Unified School District
 Amphitheater Unified School District
 Catalina Foothills Unified School District
 Flowing Wells Unified School District
 Indian Oasis-Baboquivari Unified School District
 Marana Unified School District
 Sahuarita Unified School District
 Sunnyside Unified School District
 Tanque Verde Unified School District
 Tucson Unified School District
 Vail Unified School District

Elementary:

 Altar Valley Elementary School District
 Continental Elementary School District
 Empire Elementary School District
 Redington Elementary School District
 San Fernando Elementary School District

Arizona State Schools for the Deaf and Blind is based in Tucson.

Tourist attractions

Annual events
 Pima County Fair

Locations of Interest
 Arizona-Sonora Desert Museum
 Old Tucson Studios
 Arizona Historical Society (museum)
 Tucson Gem & Mineral Show
 Titan Missile Museum
 Pima Air and Space Museum
 Mission San Xavier del Bac

See also

 National Register of Historic Places listings in Pima County, Arizona
 Pima County Sheriff's Department
 John G.F. Speiden - Jay Six Ranch
 Federal Correctional Complex, Tucson

References

External links
 Official website
 
 Pima County Government Departments

 
Arizona placenames of Native American origin
1864 establishments in Arizona Territory
Populated places established in 1864